Ken Richardson or Kenneth Richardson may refer to:

Ken Richardson (baseball) (1915–1987), American baseball player
Ken Richardson (ice hockey) (born 1951), Canadian hockey player
Ken Richardson (racing driver) (1911–1997), British racing driver
Ken Richardson (athlete) (1918–1998), English athlete
Ken Richardson (basketball) (1950–2013), American basketball player
Ken Richardson (psychologist) (born 1942), British psychologist
Ken Richardson (public servant), Official Secretary to the Governor-General of New Zealand from 1990 to 1993
 Kenneth Richardson, administrator of the Covent Garden Festival from 1996 to 2000
 Ken Richardson, chairman of Doncaster Rovers F.C.  in the 1990s